Pointe-Noire Bay is a small bay in the Republic of the Congo, at . The city of Pointe-Noire lies at the southern end of the bay.

References

Pointe-Noire
Bays of the Republic of the Congo